The fourth season of Doctor Doctor (known as The Heart Guy outside of Australasia), an Australian drama television series, premiered on Nine Network on 5 February 2020. The season will consist of 10 episodes. In the United Kingdom, Sweden, and the United States, the show was released in November and December of 2019. 

This season will see Dustin Clare, Kate Jenkinson and Robyn Nevin joining the cast.

Season four was intended to premiere on Nine in late 2019; however, it was delayed until 5 February 2020. It received its world premiere in the United Kingdom on Drama on 16 November 2019.

Cast

Main 
 Rodger Corser as Hugh Knight 
 Nicole da Silva as Charlie Knight (née Pereira)
 Ryan Johnson as Matt Knight
 Tina Bursill as Meryl Knight
 Hayley McElhinney as Penny Cartwright
 Chloe Bayliss as Hayley Mills Knight
 Matt Castley as Ajax Cross Knight
 Belinda Bromilow as Betty Bell
 Charles Wu as Ken Liu
 Miranda Tapsell as April 
 Kate Jenkinson as Tara Khourdair
 Dustin Clare as Jarrod

Special guest
 Robyn Nevin as Dinah

Recurring and guest
 Patrick Wilson as Rod Eagle
 Zoe Carides as Nancy Miller
 Uli Latukefu as Darren
 Tim Potter as Eddie
 Alice Ansara as Green Annie
 Alan Dukes as Glen
 Jerome Velinsky as Val 
 Ella Scott Lynch as Celia

Episodes

Reception

Ratings

Award nominations 

AACTA Awards (2020)
 Nominated: Best Television Drama Series – Doctor Doctor

Home media

International release
The Drama channel in the United Kingdom was the first channel to screen the fourth season. It screened two episodes every Saturday night at 10 pm and 11 pm from 16 November 2019. Acorn TV in the United States released the fourth season in its entirety on 9 December 2019. Sveriges Television in Sweden aired the fourth season (with the show titled "Hjärtats vägar" in Swedish) with three episodes a week which started on 27 November and finished on 18 December 2019.

References

2020 Australian television seasons